The Clay County Courthouse in Clay Center, Nebraska was built during 1917–19.  It was designed by architect William F. Gernandt in  Beaux Arts style, and is an "exceptionally fine" example of the ten Nebraska courthouses that he designed.  It is also an "excellent" example of the County Citadel type of county courthouse.

The building was listed on the U.S. National Register of Historic Places in 1990.

References

Courthouses on the National Register of Historic Places in Nebraska
Beaux-Arts architecture in Nebraska
Government buildings completed in 1917
Buildings and structures in Clay County, Nebraska
County courthouses in Nebraska
National Register of Historic Places in Clay County, Nebraska